Ochrosia poweri is a species of tree in the family Apocynaceae. Its natural habitat is subtropical rainforest in Australia (NSW and Queensland). Maximum height is about 10 metres.

References

poweri